Carlo Sabatini (born 23 September 1960) is an Italian football coach. He was most recently the head coach of Serie B club Como.

He is the brother of Walter Sabatini.

Career

Coach
He began his career as a coach in Pontevecchio. He then moved to the youth of Padova, where plays Alessandro Del Piero. He is then promoted to the first team, bringing in Serie B.

In 2011, he moves to Frosinone in Lega Pro Prima Divisione.

On July 5, 2012 he becomes the new coach of Carrarese in Lega Pro Prima Divisione, but on 30 September 2012 he resigned.

On November 12, 2013 he becomes the new coach of Mantova in Lega Pro Seconda Divisione.

At the end of the season 2013-14 he was promoted in the Lega Pro. May 8, 2014 leaves the Mantova.

On January 13, 2015 he becomes the new coach of Como in Lega Pro. At the end of the season he was promoted to Serie B. In October 2015, during the ongoing season, after a league match against Modena which ended 1–1, the president of Como Pietro Porro ended Carlos contract. Carlo managed Como 11 mathes in Lega Pro.

References

1960 births
Italian football managers
Living people
Sportspeople from Perugia
Calcio Padova managers
Frosinone Calcio managers
Carrarese Calcio managers
Mantova 1911 managers
Como 1907 managers